A Carnival Christmas is the third EP by American hip hop group Insane Clown Posse, released on December 6, 1994, by Psychopathic Records. It was reissued in 1997 by Island Records with alternate artwork. The reissue removed the EP's final two tracks. The first two songs on the EP are included in the compilation Forgotten Freshness Volumes 1 & 2. It is the 5th overall release by Insane Clown Posse.

Production 

"Santa Killas" contains a sample from the Cher song Gypsys, Tramps & Thieves. 
"Santa Killas" featured a guest verse by Mike E. Clark and Fink the Eastside G, a local rapper. ICP had a falling out with Fink after he stole money from Psychopathic Records.

Legacy 

"Santa Killas" has the first known use of the Juggalo slang "Whoop whoop!" which later became a greeting among fans.
"Santa Killas" and "It's Coming" were removed from the EP when it was reissued by Island Records. ICP explained that the tracks were "outdated". "It's Coming" is a teaser for ICP's then-upcoming album, Riddle Box, which was the third Joker's Card. In October 2016 it was announced that ICP will be rereleasing the EP on vinyl in late 2016.

Track listing

Personnel 
 Violent J – vocals, composer
 Shaggy 2 Dope – vocals, turntables
 Fink the Eastside G – guest vocals
 Mike E. Clark – turntables, production, guest vocals, engineer, mixing

References 

Insane Clown Posse albums
1994 EPs
1994 Christmas albums
Christmas albums by American artists